Kerry Denise Sacilotto (born 21 May 1972) is a former Australian politician. She was the Labor member for Port Darwin in the Northern Territory Legislative Assembly from 2005 to 2008. She held the positions of Deputy Speaker, Chairman of Committees, Chairman of the Select Parliamentary committee of Youth & Sport.

|}

Sacilotto owned Professionals Darwin and had worked in Residential & Commercial real estate prior to her political career, and was also Vice President of the REINT.  Sacilotto was one of the surprise victors of Labor's 2005 landslide election win, defeating the Country Liberal Party incumbent Sue Carter.  Although Carter had suffered a 10-point swing in 2001, there was little hint that she was in any serious danger of losing what had long been the safest CLP seat in Darwin.  However, in a shock result, the count remained on a knife-edge for several days after the election.  On the final count, Sacilotto unseated Carter by 73 votes on a swing of 8.4 percent, just barely enough to take the seat off the CLP.

She served one term in the Assembly before John Elferink regained Port Darwin for the CLP.

References

1972 births
Living people
Members of the Northern Territory Legislative Assembly
Australian Labor Party members of the Northern Territory Legislative Assembly
21st-century Australian politicians
Women members of the Northern Territory Legislative Assembly
21st-century Australian women politicians